The 2010–11 Old Dominion Monarchs basketball team represented Old Dominion University during the 2010–11 NCAA Division I men's basketball season. The Monarchs, led by 10th year head coach Blaine Taylor, played their home games at Ted Constant Convocation Center and are members of the Colonial Athletic Association. They finished the season 27–7, 14–4 in CAA play and were champions of the 2011 CAA men's basketball tournament to earn an automatic bid to the 2011 NCAA Division I men's basketball tournament where they lost in the second round to Butler.

Roster

Schedule

|-
!colspan=9 style=| Exhibition

|-
!colspan=9 style=| Regular season

|-
!colspan=9 style=| CAA tournament

|-
!colspan=9 style=| NCAA tournament

References

Old Dominion Monarchs men's basketball seasons
Old Dominion
Old Dominion
Old Dominion
Old Dominion